Zahir Abrahim (born 5 June 1972) is a South African former cricketer. He played in 58 first-class, 66 List A, and 15 Twenty20 matches between 1995 and 2006.

References

External links
 

1972 births
Living people
South African cricketers
Boland cricketers
Dolphins cricketers
Griqualand West cricketers
KwaZulu-Natal cricketers
People from Robertson, Western Cape
Cricketers from the Western Cape